Jordan Owens (born 9 July 1989) is a Northern Irish footballer who plays for NIFL Premiership side Crusaders as a striker. He is the club's all-time top goalscorer, having surpassed the record held by Glenn Hunter in January 2016.

Club career
Owens came up through the Crusaders youth system, and after impressive displays for the reserves, he made his debut towards the end of the 2007/08 season, scoring his first goal against Larne. He also scored the opening goal in a 4–1 Irish Cup semi-final victory over Institute to take the Crues into their first Irish Cup final in 29 years, and repeated the feat in 2011, scoring against Portadown in another Irish Cup semi final.

In the 2014–15 season he hit 30 goals as Crusaders finished as league champions. In January 2016 he scored against Rathfriland Rangers to break the Crusaders goalscoring record of 157, held since 1997 by Glenn Hunter. He is also the all-time top goalscorer in North Belfast derby matches with Crusaders' nearest rivals Cliftonville.

On 6 March 2018, Owens scored a hat-trick in a league match against Glenavon to surpass 200 goals for Crusaders, becoming the first player to reach this milestone for the club.

International career
He has represented Northern Ireland at U19, U21, and U23 level, scoring for the U23s against Poland He received a call-up to the full squad, along with team-mates Stuart Dallas and Colin Coates, for the 2011 Nations Cup games against Republic of Ireland and Wales. He made his debut against Wales, coming on in the 79th minute.

Career statistics

Honours
Crusaders
NIFL Premiership: 2014–15, 2015–16, 2017–18
Irish Cup: 2008–09, 2018–19, 2021–22
Setanta Cup: 2012
Irish League Cup (1): 2011–12
County Antrim Shield: 2009–10, 2017–18, 2018–19

References

Living people
1989 births
Association footballers from Belfast
Association footballers from Northern Ireland
Association football forwards
Crusaders F.C. players
NIFL Premiership players
Northern Ireland international footballers
Northern Ireland under-21 international footballers